"Done" is a song recorded by American country music singer Chris Janson. It is the second single from his 2019 album Real Friends. Janson wrote the song with Mitch Oglesby, Jamie Paulin, and Matt Roy.

History
According to Janson, the song was inspired by his wife, Kelly Lynn. He told the blog Taste of Country that it was his "favorite song [he'd] ever written", and that he wrote it with the intention of making a love song that was more upbeat than other ones he had written.

Mitch Oglesby, one of the song's writers, presented Janson with the song's concept during a songwriting session after noting that Janson had a tendency to say "done" whenever he was "serious about something". According to Janson, he also said this phrase when he met Kelly Lynn for the first time at a bar. Janson also told Rolling Stone that he felt the song would be a "turning point" in his career as well, calling its sound a "mid-nineties down-the-middle-of-the-road hit".

Chart performance

Weekly charts

Year-end charts

Certifications

References

2019 singles
2019 songs
Chris Janson songs
Songs written by Chris Janson
Warner Records Nashville singles